Gruver Independent School District is a public school district based in Gruver, Texas (USA).

It is mainly in Hansford County, with a small portion of the district extending into Sherman County.

In 2009, the school district was rated Exemplary by the TEA ratings, and in 2010 they followed up with another Exemplary rating for the district.

Schools 
Gruver High School (Grades 9–12)
Gruver Middle (Grades 5–8)
Gruver Elementary (Grades PK-4)
 2004 National Blue Ribbon School

References

External links 
 Gruver ISD

School districts in Hansford County, Texas
School districts in Sherman County, Texas